Variichthys is a genus of freshwater fishes in the family Terapontidae from New Guinea and northern Australia. It was formerly known as Varia, but this name is preoccupied by a genus of moth.

Species
The following species are classified within the genus Variichthys:

 Variichthys jamoerensis (Mees, 1971) (Jamur Lake grunter) 
 Variichthys lacustris (Mees & Kailola, 1977) (Lake grunter)

References

 
Terapontidae